Stadion Cibalia is a multi-purpose stadium in Vinkovci, Croatia.  It is currently used mostly for football matches and is the home ground of HNK Cibalia. It has a grass court, surrounded with a clay running surface, and stands, a part of which is covered. The stadium can hold 10,000 people, with 6,000 seats, of which 2,175 seats are under a roof and another 120 are in the luxury suite.

It is located in the southern part of the city, across the river Bosut from the city centre. It was built in 1966, and expanded in 1982, when Dinamo Vinkovci entered the Yugoslav First League for the first time. At the time the total capacity was 18,000, but mostly standing-only. It was last upgraded in 2003, when two sets of stands were fitted with a total of 3,700 seats.

The stadium was named Stadion Mladosti (Youth Stadium) up to 1992, and it is still common for people to refer to it this way.

International matches

References

Cibalia
Cibalia
Cibalia
Sport in Vinkovci
Multi-purpose stadiums in Croatia
HNK Cibalia